Kadita is an unrecognised Jewish community settlement in northern Israel. Located in the central Galilee, it falls under the jurisdiction of Merom HaGalil Regional Council.

History
In 1988 four families received land from the Israel Land Administration in return for giving up their land on Mount Meron. The site had previously been the Palestinian village of Qaddita, whose residents fled during the 1948 Arab–Israeli War. Rabbi Tarfon was buried in the area.

In 1991 an association was formed to build an ecovillage at the site, and received the support of Housing Minister Ariel Sharon. Twenty families settled on the land and temporary homes were built. Another 14 families arrived in 2000. However, the Israel Land Administration viewed the residents as squatters, issued evacuation orders and demolished temporary buildings on several occasions.

References

Community settlements
Populated places in Northern District (Israel)
Populated places established in 1991
1991 establishments in Israel
Agricultural Union